The 72nd Group Army (Unit 73011), formerly the 1st Group Army, is a military formation of the Chinese People's Liberation Army Ground Forces (PLAGF). The 71st Group Army is one of thirteen total group armies of the PLAGF, the largest echelon of ground forces in the People's Republic of China, and one of three assigned to the nation's Eastern Theater Command. Headquartered in Huzhou, Zhejiang, the unit's primary mission is likely preparation for conflict in or about the Taiwan Strait.

History
The 1st Group Army traces its origins back to the activation of the "2nd Red Army" in 1930 in Hunan. As the 358th Brigade of the 120th Division of the 8th Route Army the unit took part in the Long March. In 1946 the brigade was reorganized and redesignated as the 1st Column of the Northwest Field Army. The 1st Column was reorganized and redesignated as the 1st Corps on February 1, 1947, composed of the 358th Brigade, the 1st Independent Brigade and the 7th Brigade. In 1949 the unit was again reorganized and comprised the 1st, 2nd and 3rd Divisions. During the Chinese Civil War the 1st Corps took part in the battles for Shanzong, Fumei, and Longdong.

The 3rd Division was inactivated in 1952 and the 1st and 3rd Corps were reorganised and combined to form the 1st Corps with the 1st, 2nd, and 7th Divisions subordinate. 7th Division absorbed 9th Division, and was transferred to 1st Army, and 8th Division was absorbed by 2nd Division, 1st Corps.

Elements of the Corps arrived in Korea in April 1953. The corps was assigned to the Peking area on its return from Korea in 1958, but then arrived in the Kaifeng area in March 1961.

The 181st Division joined the army in September 1985. 

The 2nd Infantry Division of the 1st Group Army conducted routine and field training in the Langxi area of the Anhui Province from early July 1991 until October 1991. An artillery brigade organic to the 1st Division of the 1st Group Army conducted offensive exercises and joint army and air force training including signal exercises, river crossing, infantry and armor maneuvers and counter-airborne operations in the Anhui Province bordering Anhui, Zhejiang, and Jiangsu Provinces from early August to late October 1991. In late February 1992 the 2nd Division conducted routine training and marching and field training exercises in West Village, Guangde Xian, Anhui Province.

The 2nd Division was transferred to the People's Armed Police to become the 8690 Unit in the 1990s.

21st century
In 2006 Blasko reported that it comprised the 1st Amphibious Mechanized Infantry Division (Hangzhou), 3rd Motorized Infantry Brigade (Jinhua, Zhejiang), an unidentified armored division at Suzhou, Jiangsu, the 9th Artillery Division at Wuxi, Jiangsu, and an unidentified air defense brigade at Zhenjiang, Jiangsu.

By 2013 Blasko had amended his description and identified the armored division as the 10th Armoured Division (People's Republic of China), as well as adding the 5th Army Aviation Regiment at Nanjiang, Jiangsu.

An unidentified artillery division, probably the unit attached to the 1st Group Army as it is the only artillery division in the Nanjing MR, conducted tactical demonstrations in the East Anhui Mountains in late Fall 2002. The drills included simulated amphibious warfare operations as the unit conducted landing drills and during the course of the exercise had to choose an alternate landing site as the original site had "been destroyed". The unit was able to conduct fire support missions within eleven minutes of landing relocated to avoid counter-battery fires.

The 72nd Group Army appears to comprise six combined-arms maneuver brigades, one of which is heavy (armored), four medium (mechanized，two are amphibious), and one light (motorized ) and each of which lead four combined-arms battalions. These combined arms brigades are the PLAGF's basic operational unit, likely following the United States' and later Russia's transition from division-centric warfare to brigade-centric warfare. The 72nd Group Army also commands six combat support brigades.

Since 2017, the 72nd Group Army commands the following subordinate units.

 5th Amphibious Combined-Arms Brigade (ZTD-05, ZBD-05)
 10th Heavy Combined-Arms Brigade (ZTZ-96A, ZBD-04)
 34th Medium Combined-Arms Brigade (ZTL-11D, ZTL-08)
 85th Medium Combined-Arms Brigade (ZTL-11D, ZTL-08)
 90th Light Combined Arms Brigade
 124th Amphibious Combined-Arms Brigade (ZTD-05, ZBD-05)
 72nd Special Operations Brigade
 72nd Artillery Brigade
 72nd Air Defense Brigade
 72nd Army Aviation Brigade (Mi-17, Z-9, Z-10)
 72nd Engineering and Chemical Defense Brigade
 72nd Service Support

References 

Field armies of the People's Liberation Army
Eastern Theater Command
Nanjing Military Region
Military units and formations established in 1947
Military units and formations disestablished in 2017